This is a list of  German journalists, those born in Germany and who have established citizenship or residency.

A 
Aline Abboud (born 1988)
Prince Albrecht of Croÿ (born 1959)
Robin Alexander (born 1975)
Hanns Altermann (1891–1963)
Götz Aly (born 1947)
Melanie Amann (born 1978)
Karl Andree (1808–1875)
Reinhard Appel (1927–2011)
Pinar Atalay (born 1978)
Jakob Augstein (born 1967)
Rudolf Augstein (1923–2002)
Stefan Aust (born 1946)

B 

Shakuntala Banerjee (born 1973)
Peter Bartels (born 1943)
Gabi Bauer (born 1962)
Gitta Bauer (1919–1990)
Reinhold Beckmann (born 1956)
Klaus Bednarz (1942–2015)
Thomas Bellut (born 1955)
Klaus Bender (born 1938)
Klaus von Bismarck (1912–1997)
Nikolaus Blome (born 1963)
Gero von Boehm (born 1954)
Peter Boenisch (1927–2005)
Erich Böhme (1930–2009)
Alexander Bommes (born 1976)
Jan Böhmermann (born 1981)
Bettina Böttinger (born 1956)
Adolf Brand (1874–1945)
Jo Brauner (born 1937)
Nikolaus Brender (born 1949)
Klaus Bresser (born 1936)
Mathias Bröckers (born 1954)
Henryk Broder (born 1946)
Erich Brost (1903–1995)
Wibke Bruhns (1938–2019)
Gerd Bucerius (1906–1995)
Wolfgang Büchner (born 1966)
Traude Bührmann (born 1942)
Tom Buhrow (born 1958)

C 
Paul Carell (1911–1997)
Claus Hinrich Casdorff (1924–2004)
C. W. Ceram (1915–1972)
Rudolph Chimelli (1928–2016)
Sabine Christiansen (born 1957)
Harri Czepuck (1927–2015)

D 

Gerhard Delling (born 1959)
Ulrich Deppendorf (born 1950)
Kai Diekmann (born 1964)
Hoimar von Ditfurth (1921–1989)
Annette Dittert (born 1962)
Marion Dönhoff (1909–2002)
Mathias Döpfner (born 1963)
Sammy Drechsel (1925–1986)
Wolfgang Duncker (1909–1942)

E 

Fritz Eberhard (1896–1982)
Dietrich Eckart (1868–1923)
Ellen Ehni (born 1973)
Carolin Emcke (born 1967)
Lothar Erdmann (1888–1939)
Paul Ernst (1866–1933)

F 
Heribert Faßbender (born 1941)
Markus Feldenkirchen (born 1975)
Joachim Fest (1926–2006)
Angela Finger-Erben (born 1980)
Karl-Hermann Flach (1929–1973)
Matthias Fornoff (born 1963)
Georg Forster (1754–1794)
Peter Frey (born 1957)
Frederic Friedel (born 1945)
Michel Friedman (born 1956)
Hanns-Joachim Friedrichs (1927–1995)
Matthias Frings (born 1954)
Horst Fust (1930–2003)

G 
Bettina Gaus (1956–2021)
Günter Gaus (1929–2004)
Anne Gellinek (born 1962)
Annette Gerlach (born 1964)
Hellmut von Gerlach (1866–1935)
Fritz Gerlich (1883–1934)
Petra Gerster (born 1955)
Otto Gildemeister (1823–1902)
Alexander Görlach (born 1976)
Hermann L. Gremliza (1940–2019)
Ulrike von der Groeben (born 1957)
Detlef Grumbach (born 1955)

H 
Brigitte Hamann (1940–2016)
Horst Hano (born 1937)
Johannes Hano (born 1963)
Maximilian Harden (1861–1927)
Norbert Häring (born 1963)
Waldemar Hartmann (born 1948)
Hadija Haruna-Oelker (born 1980)
Tina Hassel (born 1964)
Theodor Haubach (1896–1945)
Norbert Haug (born 1952)
Gaby Hauptmann (born 1957)
Bodo Hauser (1946–2004)
Dunja Hayali (born 1974)
Wolf Heckmann (1929–2006)
Gerd Heidemann (born 1931)
Marcus Hellwig (born 1965)
Kai Hermann (born 1938)
Volker Herres (born 1954)
Rudolf Herrnstadt (1903–1966)
Felix Hirsch (1902–1982)
Jan Hofer (born 1952)
Werner Höfer (1913–1997)
Max Hofmann (born 1974)
Raphael Honigstein (born 1973)
Ernst Huberty (born 1927)

I 

Maybrit Illner (born 1965)

J 

Heinrich Eduard Jacob (1889–1967)
Claus Jacobi (1927–2013)
Siegfried Jacobsohn (1881–1926)
Oliver Janich (born 1969)
Günther Jauch (born 1956)
Josef Joffe (born 1944)

K 
August von Kageneck (1922–2004)
Hellmuth Karasek (1934–2015)
Jürgen Kaube (born 1962)
Ernst Keil (1816–1878)
Sven Felix Kellerhoff (born 1971)
Georgine Kellermann (born 1957)
Johannes B. Kerner (born 1964)
Thomas Kielinger (born 1940)
Ulrich Kienzle (1936–2020)
Susanne Kippenberger (born 1957)
Hans Hellmut Kirst (1914–1989)
Claus Kleber (born 1955)
Peter Kloeppel (born 1958)
Steffen Klusmann (born 1966)
Carsten Knop (born 1969)
Tanit Koch (born 1977)
Berthold Kohler (born 1961)
Karl-Heinz Köpcke (1922–1991)
Theo Koll (born 1958)
Siegfried Kracauer (1889–1966)
Elmar Kraushaar (born 1950)
Gabriele Krone-Schmalz (born 1949)
Dieter Kronzucker (born 1936)
Dieter Kürten (born 1935)

L 
Andreas Landwehr (born 1959)
Hans-Dieter Lange (1926–2012)
Christoph Lanz (born 1959)
Markus Lanz (born 1969)
Claus Larass (born 1944)
Gabriele Lesser (born 1960)
Hans Leyendecker (born 1949)
Christian Lindner (born 1959)
Monica Lierhaus (born 1970)
Peter Limbourg (born 1960)
Günther von Lojewski (1935–2023)
Wolf von Lojewski (born 1937)
Giovanni di Lorenzo (born 1959)
Gerhard Löwenthal (1922–2002)
Ernst-Dieter Lueg (1930–2000)

M 
Sandra Maischberger (born 1966)
Helmut Markwort (born 1936)
Harald Martenstein (born 1953)
Hede Massing (1900–1981)
Miriam Meckel (born 1967)
Ulrike Meinhof (1934–1976)
Peter Merseburger (1928–2022)
Rudolf Michael (1890–1980)
Bascha Mika (born 1954)
Sonia Seymour Mikich (born 1951)
Caren Miosga (born 1969)
Erik Möller (born 1979)
Ann-Katrin Müller (born 1987)
Katrin Müller-Hohenstein (born 1965)
Julitta Münch (1959–2020)

N 
Peretz Naftali (1888–1961)
Henri Nannen (1913–1996)
Michael Naumann  (born 1941)
Natias Neutert (born 1941)
Friedrich Nowottny (born 1929)

O 
Frederik Obermaier (born 1984)
Bastian Obermayer (born 1977)
Rudolf Olden (1885–1940)
Matthias Opdenhövel (born 1970)
Carl von Ossietzky (1889–1938)

P 
Gaby Papenburg (born 1960)
Ludwig Pfau (1821–1894)
Monika Piel (born 1951)
Frank Plasberg (born 1957)
Frederik Pleitgen (born 1976)
Fritz Pleitgen (1938–2022)
Ines Pohl (born 1967)
Alan Posener (born 1949)
Heribert Prantl (born 1953)
Günter Prinz (1929–2020)

R 
Iris Radisch (born 1959)
Judith Rakers (born 1976)
Ashwin Raman (born 1946)
Julian Reichelt (born 1981)
Johann Georg Reißmüller (1932–2018)
Anja Reschke (born 1972)
Georg Restle (born 1965)
Sir John Retcliffe (1815–1878)
Béla Réthy (born 1956)
Felix Rexhausen (1932–1992)
Claus Richter (born 1948)
Wilhelm Heinrich Riehl (1823–1897)
Udo Röbel (born 1950)
Paul Ronzheimer (born 1985)
Dagmar Rosenfeld (born 1974)
Lea Rosh (born 1936)
Jürgen Roth (1945–2017)
Thomas Roth (born 1951)
Gerd Rubenbauer (born 1948)
Anna Rüling (1880–1953)
Gerd Ruge (1928–2021)
Nina Ruge (born 1956)

S 

Dirk Sager (1940–2014)
Thomas Satinsky (born 1963)
Bettina Schausten (born 1965)
Denis Scheck (born 1964)
Fritz Schenk (1930–2006)
Frank Schirrmacher (1959–2014)
Wolf Schneider (1925–2022)
Cordt Schnibben (born 1952)
Karl-Eduard von Schnitzler (1918–2001)
Peter Scholl-Latour (1924–2014)
Jörg Schönenborn (born 1964)
Constantin Schreiber (born 1979)
Jürgen Schreiber (1947–2022)
Doris Schröder-Köpf (born 1963)
Alice Schwarzer (born 1942)
Steffen Seibert (born 1960)
Hajo Seppelt (born 1963)
Klaus-Peter Siegloch (born 1946)
Hans Siemsen (1891–1969)
Christian Sievers (born 1969)
Ferdinand Simoneit (1925–2010)
Marietta Slomka (born 1969)
Theo Sommer (1930–2022)
Richard Sorge (1895–1944)
Augustin Souchy (1892–1984)
Axel Springer (1912–1985)
Gabor Steingart (born 1962)
Susanne Stichler (born 1961)
Claus Strunz (born 1966)

T 
Peter Tamm (1928–2016)
Hartmann von der Tann (born 1943)
Hermann-Josef Tenhagen (born 1963)
Elmar Theveßen (born 1967)
Wim Thoelke (1927–1995)
Carmen Thomas (born 1946)
Hans-Hermann Tiedje (born 1949)
Thaddäus Troll (1914–1980)
Kurt Tucholsky (1890–1935)
Richard Tüngel (1893–1970)

U 

Wilhelm Ulbrich (1846–1922)
Udo Ulfkotte (1960–2017)
Leopold Ullstein (1826–1899)
Klaus Umbach (1936–2018)

V 

Larissa Vassilian (born 1976)
Werner Veigel (1928–1995)

W 

Silvia Wadhwa (born 1959)
Franz Josef Wagner (born 1943)
Günter Wallraff (born 1942)
Rüdiger von Wechmar (1923–2007)
Maria von Welser (born 1946)
Christine Westermann (born 1948)
Ulrich Wickert (born 1942)
Wilhelm Wieben (1935–2019)
Anne Will (born 1966)
Georg Wolff (1914–1996)
Theodor Wolff (1868–1943)
Jörg Wontorra (born 1948)
Olaf von Wrangel (1928–2009)
Alexandra Würzbach (born 1968)

X 

You Xie (born 1958)

Y 
Deniz Yücel (born 1973)

Z 

Peter von Zahn (1913–2001)
Ingo Zamperoni (born 1974)
Hans Zehrer (1899–1966)
Linda Zervakis (born 1975)
Annika Zimmermann (born 1989)

See also 

:Category:German journalists
List of Germans
List of German-language authors
List of German-language philosophers
List of German-language playwrights
List of German-language poets

Journalists
 
German